Zurab Sergeyevich Tsiklauri (born 3 June 1974) is a former Russian professional footballer of Georgian descent.

Club career
He made his professional debut in the Russian Premier League in 1993 for FC Krylia Sovetov Samara.

References

1974 births
Sportspeople from Samara, Russia
Russian people of Georgian descent
Living people
Russian footballers
PFC Krylia Sovetov Samara players
FC Elista players
FC Spartak Vladikavkaz players
FC Luch Vladivostok players
Russian Premier League players
Association football midfielders